May 2017

See also

References 

 05
May 2017 events in the United States